"I'll Take That as a Yes (The Hot Tub Song)" is a song written by Vince Melamed and Jon McElroy, and recorded by American country music artist Phil Vassar. It was released in November 2004 as the second single from the album Shaken Not Stirred. The song reached number 17 on the Billboard Hot Country Singles & Tracks chart.

Music video
The music video was directed by Shaun Silva and premiered in 2005.

Chart performance

References

2004 singles
Phil Vassar songs
Songs written by Vince Melamed
Song recordings produced by Frank Rogers (record producer)
Arista Nashville singles
2004 songs